István Pásztor may refer to:

 István Pásztor (politician) (born 1956), Serbian politician of Hungarian descent
  (born 1957)
 István Pásztor (cyclist) (1926–2015), Hungarian cyclist
 István Pásztor (handballer) (born 1971), Hungarian handballer

See also
 Pasztor (disambiguation)